Sisterhood of Hip Hop is an American reality television series on Oxygen starring five female rappers who "navigate their way through the male-dominated music industry." The show is executive produced by rapper T.I. and premiered on August 12, 2014.

Cast

Timeline Of Sisters

Main

Brianna Perry (Season 1-)
Brianna Perry is a former Missy Elliott protégée who has been active in the music industry since the age of 5. She was formerly signed to Elliott's label The Goldmind Inc. alongside Trina's Diva Enterprises. Perry would go on to gain viral exposure in 2012 for her single "Marilyn Monroe", which was featured on Beyoncé's official website.

Siya (Season 1-)
Michele Sherman, better known as her stage name Siya, is an openly gay rapper, who became infamously known for feuding with Kreayshawn associate V-Nasty.

Diamond (Season 1-)
Brittany Nicole Carpentero, better known by her stage name Diamond, is best known for being one-sixth of the rap group Crime Mob.

Lee Mazin (Season 3-)
Real Name: Taliyah Smith

Audra The Rapper (Season 3-)
Real Name & Birthdate: Audra Green on October 4, 1989

Former

Bia (Season 1-2)
Bianca Treal, best known as Bia Landrau or simply Bia, is infamously known for her song "High" and her remixes, alongside her working relationship with Grammy Award-winning artist Pharrell. She is currently signed to his label i Am Other.

Nyemiah Supreme (Season 1-2)
Nyemiah Streeter, best known as Nyemiah Supreme, is an American female rapper who is best known for her 2013 debut single "Rock & Roll", featuring mentor Timbaland. She has also danced backup for numerous r&b acts. In 2015 she released "No Questions featuring K-Camp.

Chloe Riley (Season 2)
Chloe Riley is a San Diego-raised native who has garnered a record deal with Slip-N-Slide, former home to fellow female rapper Trina.

Guest appearances
Trina — Fellow platinum-selling female rapper and Brianna Perry's former mentor
Eve — Grammy Award-winning female rapper, fashion designer and actress
Soulja Boy — Rapper and Diamond's ex-boyfriend
Irv Gotti — Record producer and label owner of The Inc. Records,which established multi-platinum recording artists: Ashanti, Ja Rule and Lloyd
Timbaland — Multi-platinum producer and musician and childhood friend of Missy Elliott
Tank — R&B singer-songwriter and Siya's manager
Tristan "Mack" Wilds — Actor and musician
Travie McCoy — Rapper and member of Gym Class Heroes
Rico Love — R&B singer-songwriter
Ja Rule — Multi-platinum recording artist and actor
Pharrell Williams — Grammy Award-winning artist from the production duo The Neptunes and rap trio N*E*R*D
Rick Ross — Platinum-selling rapper and Brianna Perry's former collaborator
Fat Joe — Grammy Award-winning rapper & CEO of Terror Squad Entertainment, a label responsible for introducing female rapper Remy Ma
DJ Khaled — DJ, rapper and label owner of We The Best Music Group
Lil Jon — Multi-platinum rapper and producer
Da Brat — Fellow female rapper & Diamond's friend
T-Pain — Grammy Award-winning singer
Brooke Valentine — Girl Fight
Adrienne Bailon — Host of The Real, Singer, Actress

Episodes

Season 1 (2014)

Season 2 (2015)

Season 3 (2016)

Broadcast
The series debuted in the United States on Oxygen on August 12, 2014. The second season premiered on June 9, 2015.

Internationally, the series premiered in Australia on September 24, 2015 on Channel [V].

References

External links

2010s American reality television series
2014 American television series debuts
2016 American television series endings
African-American reality television series
English-language television shows
Oxygen (TV channel) original programming
Television series by 51 Minds Entertainment
Women in hip hop music
T.I.